Richard Vaughan may refer to:

Politicians
 Richard Vaughan (of Corsygedol) (died 1636), Welsh MP for Merioneth in 1628
 Richard Vaughan, 2nd Earl of Carbery (died 1686), Welsh soldier, peer and politician

 Richard Vaughan (judge) (c. 1655–1724), Member of Parliament (MP) for Carmarthen
 Richard Vaughan (MP for Bristol), see Bristol
 Richard Vaughan (died 1734) (c. 1665–1734), Welsh politician

Sports
 Richard Vaughan (badminton) (born 1978), British badminton player
 Richard Vaughan (cricketer) (1908–1966), English cricketer
 Richard Vaughan (ice hockey), American college ice hockey coach
 Slim Vaughan (Richard Edward Vaughan, 1910–1992), American baseball player

Others
 Richard Vaughan (bishop) (1550–1607), bishop of Chester, 1597–1604
 Richard Vaughan (robotics) (born 1971), British researcher based in Canada
 Richard Vaughan, British film and news narrator noted for episodes on Seconds From Disaster

See also
 Richard Vaughn (disambiguation)